"Nelson Mandela" (known in some versions as "Free Nelson Mandela") is a song written by British musician Jerry Dammers, and performed by the band the Special A.K.A. with a lead vocal by Stan Campbell. It was first released on the single "Nelson Mandela"/"Break Down the Door" in 1984.

It was a protest against the imprisonment of Nelson Mandela by the apartheid South African government, and is considered a notable anti-apartheid song.

The backing vocals were performed by Molly and Polly Jackson, two girls the band's drummer John Bradbury had "met in a bar in Camden", while the chorus was performed by session singers including Claudia Fontaine and Caron Wheeler, who later went on to appear with Soul II Soul.

Unlike most protest songs, the track is upbeat and celebratory, drawing on musical influences from South Africa. The song peaked at number nine on the UK Singles Chart and was immensely popular in Africa. In December 2013, following the news of Nelson Mandela's death, the single re-entered at number 96 on the UK Singles Chart.

Reception 
Dammers told Radio Times: "I knew very little about Mandela until I went to an anti-apartheid concert in London in 1983, which gave me the idea for 'Nelson Mandela'. I never knew how much impact the song would have: it was a hit around the world, and it got back into South Africa and was played at sporting events and ANC rallies. It became an anthem."

Stan Campbell left the band right after the recording of the song and the release of the video for the song, and had to be persuaded to rejoin briefly for two live appearances on the BBC television show Top of the Pops in 1984. Following those appearances, Campbell left for good.

In 1984, the students' union at Wadham College, Oxford, passed a motion to end every college "bop" (dance) with the song. The tradition continues to this day. A Nelson Mandela 70th Birthday Tribute remake, released in 1988, featured Elvis Costello, Dave Wakeling, Ranking Roger and Lynval Golding on backing vocals.

At the Nelson Mandela 90th Birthday Tribute in London's Hyde Park in June 2008, the song was performed as the show's finale, with Amy Winehouse on lead vocals. However, careful listening to the soundtrack revealed that, instead of "Free Nelson Mandela", she at times sang "Free Blakey, My Fella" (a reference to her husband, Blake Fielder-Civil, a former drug dealer imprisoned for assault).

The song was featured on Peter Kay's spoof television programme Britain's Got the Pop Factor. In March 2010, the New Statesman listed it as one of the "Top 20 Political Songs". Bruce Springsteen and the E Street band opened with the song in January 2014, at the Bellville Velodrome in Cape Town, South Africa, in the band's first ever concert in South Africa, which took place just six weeks after Mandela's death. Springsteen later dedicated "We Are Alive" to Mandela.

Track listing

Recording of 1984
CHS TT26 7"
 "Nelson Mandela" (Dammers) – 4:12
 "Break Down the Door!" (Dammers, Campbell, Bradbury) – 3:48

CHS TT1226 12"
 "Nelson Mandela (Extended Version)" (Dammers) – 4:34
 "Break Down the Door! (Extended Version)" (Dammers, Campbell, Bradbury) – 5:01

Chrysalis 12" 4V9 42793 – American Version 
 "Free Nelson Mandela (Club Mix)" (Dammers) – 6:28
 "Free Nelson Mandela (Instrumental Mix)" (Dammers) – 4:30
 "Free Nelson Mandela (LP Version)" (Dammers) – 4:07

Recording of 1988
Tone FNM1 7" (70th Birthday Remake)
 "Free Nelson Mandela (70th Birthday Remake)" (Dammers)
 "Nelson Mandela (Original Version)" (Dammers)

Tone FNMX1 12" (70th Birthday Remake)
 "Free Nelson Mandela (The Whole World is Watching Dance Mix)" (Dammers)
 "Nelson Mandela (Original Version)" (Dammers)

Personnel

Recording of 1984
 Elvis Costello – producer
 Stan Campbell – lead vocals
 Jerry Dammers – organ
 John Shipley – guitar 
 Gary McManus – bass 
 John Bradbury – drums 
 Rhoda Dakar – vocals 
 Molly Jackson – vocals
 Polly Jackson – vocals
 Dick Cuthell – trumpet 
 Andy Aderinto – saxophone 
 David Heath – flute 
 Paul Speare – penny whistle
 Afrodiziak (Caron Wheeler, Naomi Thompson, Claudia Fontaine), Molly Jackson, Polly Jackson, Lynval Golding, Elvis Costello, Ranking Roger, Dave Wakeling – backing vocals

Recording of 1988
 Jerry Dammers, Tom Fredrickes – producer
 Ndonda Khuze – lead vocals
 Jerry Dammers – bass program, drum program, keyboards
 Rhythm Doctor – scratches
 Jonas Gwangwa – trombone
 Betty Boo Hlelea, Julia Mathunjwa, Pinise Saul – backing vocals

Charts

Weekly charts

Year-end charts

References

Songs about Nelson Mandela
1984 singles
1988 singles
Number-one singles in New Zealand
Songs written by Jerry Dammers
The Specials songs
2 Tone Records singles
1984 songs
Songs about South Africa
Songs about prison
Songs about freedom
Anti-apartheid songs
Song recordings produced by Elvis Costello